David "Dave" Heron (born 1 March 1958) is an English former professional rugby league footballer who played in the 1970s, 1980s and 1990s.

Playing career

International honours
Dave Heron won caps for Great Britain while at Leeds in 1982 against Australia (sub), and Australia.

County Cup Final appearances
David Heron played right- (replaced by interchange/substitute Bryan Adams) in Leeds' 15-6 victory over Halifax in the 1979 Yorkshire Cup Final during the 1979–80 season at Headingley, Leeds on Saturday 27 October 1979, played  in the 8-7 victory over Hull Kingston Rovers in the 1980 Yorkshire Cup Final during the 1980–81 season at Fartown Ground, Huddersfield on Saturday 8 November 1980, and played  in the 33-12 victory over Castleford in the 1988 Yorkshire Cup Final during the 1988–89 season at Elland Road, Leeds on Sunday 16 October 1988.

John Player/John Player Special/Regal Trophy Final appearances
David Heron played  in Leeds' 4-15 defeat by Wigan in the 1982–83 John Player Trophy Final during the 1982–83 season at Elland Road, Leeds on Saturday 22 January 1983, played  in the 14-15 defeat by St. Helens in the 1987–88 John Player Special Trophy Final during the 1987–88 season at Central Park, Wigan on Saturday 9 January 1988, and played  in Bradford Northern's 8-15 defeat by Wigan in the 1992–93 Regal Trophy Final during the 1992–93 season at Elland Road, Leeds on Saturday 23 January 1993.

Testimonial match
Dave Heron's Testimonial match at Leeds took place in 1987.

References

External links
!Great Britain Statistics at englandrl.co.uk (statistics currently missing due to not having appeared for both Great Britain, and England)
(archived by web.archive.org) Profile at leedsrugby.dnsupdate.co.uk

1958 births
Living people
English rugby league players
Batley Bulldogs players
Bradford Bulls players
Great Britain national rugby league team players
Leeds Rhinos players
Place of birth missing (living people)
Rugby league locks
Rugby league players from Yorkshire
Rugby league second-rows
Yorkshire rugby league team players